Yongkang South railway station is a railway station in Yongkang, Jinhua, Zhejiang, China. It is the only passenger railway station in the city. Freight is handled by Yongkang East.

History 
The station opened on 26 December 2015 with the Jinhua–Wenzhou high-speed railway. In June 2021, a project to divert the Jinhua–Wenzhou railway via Yongkang South was completed. The last service called at Yongkang railway station on 15 June 2021, all services at Yongkang now call at Yongkang South. On 25 June 2021, the Jinhua–Taizhou railway opened, of which Yongkang South is the eastern terminus.

References 

Railway stations in Zhejiang
Railway stations in China opened in 2015
Yongkang, Zhejiang
Buildings and structures in Jinhua